The 2004 Florida Democratic presidential primary was held on March 9 in the U.S. state of Florida as one of the Democratic Party's statewide nomination contests ahead of the 2004 presidential election.

Results

References 

Florida
Democratic primary
2004